The S&NA South Subdivision is a railroad line owned by CSX Transportation in the U.S. state of Alabama. At its north end it continues south from the Boyles Terminal Subdivision and at its south end it continues south as the M&M Subdivision.

See also
 List of CSX Transportation lines

References

CSX Transportation lines
Rail infrastructure in Alabama